In the 2020–21 season, USM Alger is competing in the Ligue 1 for the 43rd season, as well as the Algerian Cup.  It is their 26th consecutive season in the top flight of Algerian football. They competing in Ligue 1, League Cup and the Super Cup.

Summary season
On 13 May, Achour Djelloul announced that he signed with Antar Yahia to be the new sports director for three years and Abdelghani Haddi as a new general manager. Yahia said that he had offers from France, but he preferred the Reds and Blacks project, especially the ideas he wanted to implement are the same as Achour Djelloul. On 6 July, USM Alger singe a two-year contract with Aïn Benian École supérieure d'hôtellerie et restauration d'Alger until the completion of the work of the training center, The contract will allow USM Alger to use the stadium, the swimming pool, the weight room, the hotel, the sports hall, the offices and the recovery and massage room. 

On July 20, 2020 FIFA prohibiting USM Alger from any recruitment of Algerian or foreign players during the next three transfer window until the payment of 200,000 euros to the former player Prince Ibara. The next day General Manager Abdelghani Haddi spoke about this problem, and also the problem of the former player Mohamed Yekhlef and the Derby case, Where did Haddi say that he asked the Algerian Football Federation to pay Ibara's money from 2019–20 CAF Champions League prize money. 

On 25 July, Mohamed Rabie Meftah stated that he is going to leave USM Alger after Sporting director Antar Yahia told him that the new coach of USM Alger does not want him. Meftah, said he spent nine wonderful years with the club and he played with all of his heart. On 31 July, Abdelghani Haddi spoke about some newspapers and responded to them and the fake news about the value of buying USM Alger's shares, where he said that the amount was 2 billion dinars about 13 million euros, for information SERPORT is a holding company which manages the State's holdings in Algerian port services. It generates a turnover of nearly 500 million euros per year, for a net profit which oscillates between 25 and 40 million euros. On August 5, USM Alger officially announced François Ciccolini as the club's new coach, and his technical staff will be Benaraibi Bouziane as first assistant, the former international Mohamed Benhamou as goalkeepers coach, Nicolas Baup as physical trainer and Sylvain Matrisciano as head of the training center and trainer of the under 21. 

On 8 September, USM Alger announced that they had signed a three-year contract with the Italian brand Kappa, they have been the first Algerian club to sign with an original brand company. On 17 September, USM Alger sent a special plane to France to bring the technical staff and five players Guendouz, Beneddine, Akkal, Soula and Abdeldjelil after obtaining a special license from the Algerian authorities. On 30 October, Groupe SERPORT decided to merge the position of Sports Director and General Manager give all powers to Antar Yahia. Djelloul said "We want to avoid mixing things up". 

On October 4, The Federal Bureau decided to play Algerian Super Cup Final before the kick-off of the 2020–21 season on 21 November. After a long wait due to the closure of the borders, Zakaria Benchaâ returned to Algeria, Antar Yahia declared that Benchaâ had good abilities and that he would train with the Reserve team, and if his mentality did not align with the team philosophy, he would not be in the club’s squad. After losing the Super Cup final, USM Alger decided to sack François Ciccolini from his post because he did not rise to the podium to receive the medal, which was considered an insult to an official body who was the Prime Minister Abdelaziz Djerad. 

On 5 December, USMA agreed with former club coach Thierry Froger to lead the first team for one season after a consultation with Yahia and some lead players. The sports company with shares (SSPA) and the amateur sports club (CSA) signed a partnership agreement on January 31, 2021, this agreement that allows the two parties to comply with Algerian legislative texts, and the amateur club will receive 30 million dinars annually in exchange for carrying the logo and name of the club. On 7 March, due to the poor results Froger and his assistant Bouziane were sacked and replaced by the former coach last season Mounir Zeghdoud. On April 1, USM Alger gets a makeover, the official website of the Italian equipment manufacturer "Kappa" has unveiled the new jerseys that the Usmists will wear this year 2021, This new Kappa jersey is dressed in a dominant white and black, and uses the graphics of the Casbah of Algiers with shades of gray on the front of the jersey. For reasons of comfort and aesthetics, a semi-open round neck is present, just like the iconic Banda Kappa on the shoulders. Four rounds before the end of the season SERPORT decided to dismiss Antar Yahia from his position, Yahia said that all powers were removed and they agreed with a new sports director a while ago. This season witnessed the death of the former player of the sixties Hamid Bernaoui as well as Kamel Tchalabi who played with the club in the seventies and the former coach on four occasions Noureddine Saâdi the last two due to the COVID-19 pandemic in Algeria.

Pre-season and friendlies

Competitions

Overview

{| class="wikitable" style="text-align: center"
|-
!rowspan=2|Competition
!colspan=8|Record
!rowspan=2|Started round
!rowspan=2|Final position / round
!rowspan=2|First match	
!rowspan=2|Last match
|-
!
!
!
!
!
!
!
!
|-
| Ligue 1

|  
| 4th
| 28 November 2020
| 24 August 2021
|-
| Super Cup

| Final
| style="background:silver;"| Runners–up
| colspan=2| 21 November 2020
|-
| League Cup

| Round of 16
| Semi-finals
| 8 May 2021
| 8 June 2021
|-
! Total

Ligue 1

League table

Results summary

Results by round

Matches
On 22 October 2020, the Algerian Ligue Professionnelle 1 fixtures were announced.

Algerian Super Cup

Algerian League Cup

Squad information

Playing statistics

Appearances (Apps.) numbers are for appearances in competitive games only including sub appearances
Red card numbers denote:   Numbers in parentheses represent red cards overturned for wrongful dismissal.

Goalscorers
Includes all competitive matches. The list is sorted alphabetically by surname when total goals are equal.

Penalties

Clean sheets
Includes all competitive matches.

Squad list
Players and squad numbers last updated on 24 August 2021.Note: Flags indicate national team as has been defined under FIFA eligibility rules. Players may hold more than one non-FIFA nationality.

Transfers

In

Out

New contracts

Notes

References

2020-21
Algerian football clubs 2020–21 season